Akounak Tedalat Taha Tazoughai, (English: Rain the Color of Blue with A Little Red In It), is a 2015 Niger drama musical film directed by Christopher Kirkley and co–produced by Sahel Sounds, L'Improbable and Tenere Films. It is the world's first Tuareg-language fiction film. The film is based on the real life incidents of famous musician Mdou Moctar.

The film has shot at Agadez, Niger. The film received positive reviews and won several awards at international film festivals. It is a homage to Prince’s 1984 rock drama Purple Rain.

Plot

Cast
 Mdou Moctar as himself
 Kader Tanoutanoute as Kader
 Fatimata Falo as Mother
 Rhaicha Ibrahim as Rhaicha
 Ahmoudou Madassane as Ahmoudou
 Abdoulaye Souleymane as Father

References

External links
 
 Official trailer
 Akounak Tedalat Taha Tazoughai: The Purple Rain of the Sahara + Q&A with Mdou Moctar
 Akounak Tedalat Taha Tazoughai (2015)

2015 films
Nigerien drama films
2010s biographical films